The 1994–95 NCAA Division I men's ice hockey season began in October 1994 and concluded with the 1995 NCAA Division I men's ice hockey tournament's championship game on April 1, 1995, at the Providence Civic Center in Providence, Rhode Island. This was the 48th season in which an NCAA ice hockey championship was held and is the 101st year overall where an NCAA school fielded a team.

Regular season

Season tournaments

Standings

1995 NCAA tournament

Note: * denotes overtime period(s)

Player stats

Scoring leaders
The following players led the league in points at the conclusion of the season.

  
GP = Games played; G = Goals; A = Assists; Pts = Points; PIM = Penalty minutes

Leading goaltenders
The following goaltenders led the league in goals against average at the end of the regular season while playing at least 33% of their team's total minutes.

GP = Games played; Min = Minutes played; W = Wins; L = Losses; OT = Overtime/shootout losses; GA = Goals against; SO = Shutouts; SV% = Save percentage; GAA = Goals against average

Awards

NCAA

CCHA

ECAC

Hockey East

* No Distinction was made between First- and Second-Team All-Stars

WCHA

See also
 1994–95 NCAA Division II men's ice hockey season
 1994–95 NCAA Division III men's ice hockey season

References

External links
College Hockey Historical Archives
1994–95 NCAA Standings

 
NCAA